Kiritokia e-te Tomairangi Paki (1953 – 3 April 2017) was a prominent Māori kuia, and the daughter of Queen Te Arikinui Dame Te Atairangikaahu. She was the elder sister of King Tūheitia.

Paki was a prominent exponent of kapa haka, and tutored the Taniwharau kapa haka to national victory in 1981. She received a life membership award from Tainui Cultural Trust for her work within kapa haka in 2016.

Paki won a scholarship to learn world dances and choose to study Hawaiian Hula. She spent several years in Hawaii and became a Kumu Hula and returned to New Zealand establishing her own Kumu Hula called Nā Keiki O Ka Aina.

She was a patron for He Kura Te Tangata, a festival which celebrates kaumatua and kapa haka.

Paki died peacefully in her sleep on 3 April 2017. Her tangi was held at Waahi Pa in Huntly where her body lay in state before being taken for burial at the royal cemetery at Mount Taupiri.

References

External links
News article and video of Paki's tangi

1954 births
2017 deaths
Tainui people
People from Huntly, New Zealand
New Zealand Māori people